The Battle of Modder River was an engagement in the Boer War, fought at Modder River, on 28 November 1899. A British column under Lord Methuen, that was attempting to relieve the besieged town of Kimberley, forced Boers under General Piet Cronjé to retreat to Magersfontein, but suffered heavy casualties altogether.

Background
When the war broke out, one of the Boers' early targets was the diamond-mining centre of Kimberley, which stood not far from the point where the borders of the Boer republics of the Transvaal and the Orange Free State, and the British-controlled Cape Colony met. Although their forces surrounded the town, they did not press home any immediate assault. Nor did they attempt to cross the Orange River on this front to invade Cape Colony.

Meanwhile, British reinforcements were on their way to South Africa. Their commander, General Sir Redvers Buller detached the 1st Division under Lieutenant General Lord Methuen to relieve the Siege of Kimberley. This decision was made partly for reasons of prestige, as the capture of Kimberley (which contained the famous Imperialist and former Prime Minister of Cape Colony, Cecil Rhodes) would be a major propaganda victory for the British.

During November, Methuen's force advanced north along the Western Cape Railway. They fought and won two engagements against Boers from the Orange Free State under General Prinsloo at the Battle of Belmont and at Graspan. At least one American, Lance Corporal Hollon Bush of the 7th Company, First Battalion Coldstream Guards was present and wounded at the Battle of Modder River. His journey to enlist from departure in New Orleans to England was not without many pitfalls before beginning service at the Tower of London, then on to Gibraltar and South Africa.

Boer plans

The Boers had been reinforced by a substantial contingent from the Transvaal under General Koos de la Rey, who proposed a radical new plan of defence. He pointed out that the Boers had previously been easily driven from the kopjes (hills) which they had occupied. The kopjes had been obvious aiming marks for the numerically superior British artillery. Also, the trajectory of rifle fire from Boers on the top of the kopjes was steeply plunging. It therefore had a chance of hitting its target only in the last six feet or so of its flight. Once British infantry had reached the foot of the kopje, they were concealed by boulders and scrub, and could then easily drive the Boers off the summit with the bayonet.

De la Rey proposed to make use of the flat trajectory of the Mauser rifle with which the Boers were armed, together with the flat veld. He called on his men to dig trenches in the banks of the Modder River, from which their rifles could sweep the veld for a great distance, and won them over. General Piet Cronje, who arrived later with the main Boer force, acquiesced in this novel plan.

The area contained two prominent hotels and the village of Rosmead, which was used as a resort by prominent businessmen from Kimberley. The Boers had six field guns and one Maxim "pom-pom" (small rapid-firing gun) from the Orange Free State's Staatsartillerie (state artillery). They deployed these not as a concentrated battery, but as widely separated individual gun detachments north of the Modder and to the east. They had dug several emplacements for each gun, allowing their guns to switch position to avoid counter-battery fire.

British plans
Methuen's force consisted of two infantry brigades (the Guards Brigade under Major-General Sir Henry Edward Colville and the 9th Brigade under Major-General Reginald Pole-Carew), two mounted regiments, three batteries of field artillery (18th, 62nd and 75th) and four guns of the Naval Brigade. Further reinforcements were arriving up the railway.

The British cavalry (the 9th Lancers and a unit recruited in Cape Town, Rimington's Guides), made some attempts to scout the ground ahead of the army, but failed entirely to detect De la Rey's trenches and other preparations. (For example, the Boers had whitewashed stones on the veld or had placed biscuit tins as range markers). At 4:30 am on 28 November, Methuen's force roused itself, deployed into line and began advancing towards the Modder, with no plans other than to cross the river before having breakfast on the far side.

Battle

As the British troops came within  of the river, Methuen remarked to Colville, "They're not here." Colville replied, "They're sitting uncommonly tight if they are". At this point the Boers opened fire. Most of the British troops were forced to throw themselves flat. Some tried to advance in short rushes, but could find no cover on the veld. The Guards tried to outflank the Boer left, but were unable to ford the Riet River. The British guns pounded the buildings near Modder River Station and the line of poplar trees which marked the north bank of the Modder, and entirely missed the enemy trenches on the south bank. Meanwhile, the Boer guns maintained a galling fire, and kept in action by repeatedly moving their positions.

The battle became a day-long stalemate. Most of the British infantry lay prone on the veld, tortured by heat and thirst, but safe from enemy fire unless they moved. Many stoically smoked pipes or even slept. Methuen galloped about the field trying to renew the advance, and was himself wounded. At midday, some of Pole-Carew's 9th Brigade found the open Boer right flank at Rosmead drift (ford) downstream. British infantry infiltrated across the ford and about 1:00 pm drove the Boers out of Rosmead. The attack was disjointed, and suffered casualties when a British field artillery battery (62nd) which had just arrived on the field shelled them by mistake. By nightfall, De la Rey had driven them back into a small insecure bridgehead.

Nevertheless, the Boers feared that they were now vulnerable to being outflanked, and withdrew during the night.

Aftermath
Methuen reported that the battle had been "one of the hardest and most trying fights in the annals of the British army". Although casualties had not been cripplingly heavy (between 450 and 480), mainly because the Boers opened fire prematurely, it was clear that any simple frontal attack by infantry only against an enemy using bolt-action rifles, was effectively impossible. The British were forced to pause for ten days, to evacuate their casualties, receive further reinforcements and repair their lines of communications. The delay allowed the Boers to construct the entrenchments which they were to defend in the Battle of Magersfontein.

On the Boer side, there were about 80 casualties, including, Adriaan, the eldest son of Koos de la Rey, mortally wounded by a shell.

Account of the battle
Modder River – 28 November 1899
British Victory ~ Was a tiring day again with the heat and especially after forming at 4:30 am and being the 3rd battle in a week. Boers fled after British catch vital positions. Fiercest battle yet fought in the war. An almost impossible offensive task. The total Boer casualties may perhaps have amounted to 150, mainly due to shell-fire. 70 British were killed and another 413 were wounded.

References

Bibliography

 
 
 
 Pretorius, F. Historical Dictionary of the Anglo-Boer War. Lanham, Md: Scarecrow Press, 2009, pages 285–288.

External links

 Lord Methuen and the British Advance to the Modder River

See also
 Military history of South Africa
 Battle of Paardeberg

Conflicts in 1899
Battles of the Second Boer War
Kimberley, Northern Cape
1899 in the Cape Colony
History of the Northern Cape
November 1899 events